Musa 'Pisang Awak' is an edible banana cultivar belonging to the AABB banana cultivar group. This cultivar is grown worldwide.

Etymology

'Pisang Awak' is also known in Australia as 'Ducasse' and 'Kayinja' in Uganda. The Malaysian name pisang awak is more commonly used among research institutions. In Thailand it is known as kluai nam wa. The term nam wa has crossed over into the Khmer language where the banana is known in Cambodia as chek nam va, but is known in the Khmer-speaking Thai province of Surin as chek sâ or white banana. This banana variety has multiple romanizations including 'Namwah Tall' (with a superfluous 'h'). In Vietnamese it is known as chuối sứ ("envoy banana") or chuối xiêm ("Siamese banana"). In the Philippines it is commonly called lagkitan in the Southern Tagalog region or botolan in the Palawan region. 

As a stout mutation, 'Dwarf Pisang Awak' is known in America as 'Dwarf Namwah' as popularized by Agristarts; and in Thai as kluai nam wa khom.

Description

It is known to produce seed with the availability of fertile pollen.

Taxonomy

'Pisang Awak' is a cross between Musa acuminata and Musa balbisiana. It belongs to the tetraploid AABB genome group, although it was earlier thought to belong to the triploid ABB genome group. Synonyms include: Musa paradisiaca var. awak.

Uses

'Pisang Awak' (known locally as kayinja) is grown in Uganda for making banana beer.

In Cambodia, 'Pisang Awak' (known locally as chek nam va) is favored over varieties for its multiple uses while other varieties are valued for the fruit. The banana blossoms (at the stage of male flower production) and pseudostem, although astringent, are eaten as a vegetable. The folded leaves are used as a container for making steamed curries, including fish amok, and ansom chek in which the fragrance of the banana leaves is transferred to the food being cooked.

See also
 Banana
 Banana Cultivar Groups
 Musa
 Musa acuminata

References

Banana cultivars